Michael Weber (born December 16, 1987) is an American former professional ice hockey defenseman. He previously played with the Buffalo Sabres and Washington Capitals of the National Hockey League (NHL) and Frölunda HC of the Swedish Hockey League (SHL). He is currently an assistant coach for the Rochester Americans in the American Hockey League (AHL).

Playing career

Early
Weber played hockey for the Pittsburgh Junior B Penguins as a youth. He began his major junior career with the Windsor Spitfires of the Ontario Hockey League during the 2003-04 season. Following his third season with the club, Weber was drafted in the second round, 57th overall, by the Buffalo Sabres during the 2006 NHL Entry Draft. In his final major junior season, Weber was traded to the Barrie Colts.

Professional

Buffalo Sabres
Weber joined the Sabres' American Hockey League affiliate, the Rochester Americans, for the 2007–08 AHL season. He was called up by the Sabres on two occasions early in the same season. He was recalled for a third time in March 2008 and scored his first NHL point on March 12 with an assist in his hometown against the Pittsburgh Penguins. His first NHL goal was scored on December 28, 2010 against Nikolai Khabibulin of the Edmonton Oilers.

On July 4, 2011, the Sabres signed Weber to a two-year, $1.9 million contract extension. Weber struggled during the 2011–12 season as he finished it with a minus-19 with the Sabres failing to make the playoffs. His play improved a lot for the shortened 2012–13 season after the acquisition of his longtime best friend Steve Ott. Weber established himself as a leader to the Sabres young defensive core. However, the Sabres once again failed to make the playoffs for the second season in a row. Due to his improvement the Sabres re-signed Weber to a 3-year, $5 million contract extension.

On February 20, 2015, after being on the receiving end of a borderline hit by Tanner Glass of the New York Rangers, Weber lifted Glass by the scruff of the neck and over the ice to be delivered to the game's linesmen to serve his penalty. Weber left the game early, provoking a fight between Glass and Weber's teammate Tyson Strachan.

Washington Capitals
During the 2015–16 season, having spent all nine of his professional years with the Sabres, Weber was traded to the Washington Capitals for a third round pick in the 2017 NHL Entry Draft on February 23, 2016. Used sparingly as a depth defenseman, Weber was unable to help the Capitals progress deep into the playoffs, and became a free agent over the summer.

Later career
On August 25, 2016, unable to secure an NHL contract, Weber agreed to a  professional try out contract with the St. Louis Blues. He was released from his PTO on October 7. He went on to sign a two-way professional try-out contract with the Iowa Wild on October 20, 2016. In adding veteran leadership, Weber quickly established himself as team captain and on February 28, 2017, he was signed to a two-way contract with NHL affiliate, the Minnesota Wild, for the remainder of the season.

Weber signed with Frölunda HC of the Swedish Hockey League on November 9, 2017. However, after just 10 games with the club, Weber announced his retirement from professional hockey on December 27 due to a lingering knee injury.

Coaching career
Following his retirement from professional hockey Mike Weber joined the Windsor Spitfires, his former OHL team, as an assistant coach in January 2018.

On September 17, 2020, Weber was hired as an assistant coach by his former team, the Rochester Americans, of the American Hockey League.

Personal
Weber was raised in suburban Pittsburgh and attended Seneca Valley High School in Harmony, Pennsylvania
, and later attended St. Anne's High School in Tecumseh, Ontario while playing in the OHL.

Career statistics

References

External links

1987 births
Living people
American men's ice hockey defensemen
Barrie Colts players
Buffalo Sabres draft picks
Buffalo Sabres players
Frölunda HC players
Sportspeople from Pittsburgh
Ice hockey coaches from Pennsylvania
Iowa Wild players
Lørenskog IK players
Portland Pirates players
Rochester Americans players
Washington Capitals players
Windsor Spitfires players
Ice hockey people from Pittsburgh